The Grupo De Apoyo a la Democracia (Group for the Support of Democracy) is a group of dissident Cuban exiles living in the United States. 

In 2006, they were accused of misusing US governmental funding for "computer games, cashmere sweaters, crabmeat and expensive chocolates".

References

Politics of Cuba
Diaspora organizations in the United States